Cécile Thévenet (born November 22, 1872) was a Belgian opera singer.

Early life 

Cécile Thévenet was born in Bruges, the daughter of Alphonse Thévenet and Anne Van Vyve. Her father was a music teacher and baritone singer. She was raised and educated in Brussels.

Career 
Cécile Thévenet sang with the Opéra-Comique in Paris. "Alike as a singer and an actress Mlle. Thévenet is a very great artist, a wonderfully clever creator of the characters she represents", commented one American publication in 1905. In 1913 she sang the part of Euryclea in the premiere of Gabriel Fauré's Pénélope in Paris, with Lucienne Bréval in the title role. She was also in the original cast of the Gustave Charpentier opera Julien, in 1913. She was known for her performances of Carmen.

Other roles Thévenet sang included Musette in Leoncavallo's La bohéme (1899), Leoncavallo's Zaza (1900), Caroline in Die Fledermaus (1904), La Chouanne (1907), the Nurse in Paul Dukas's Ariane et Barbe-bleue (1910), and Massenet's Thérèse (1913).

Personal life 
Thévenet died after May 1914.

References

External links 

 A photograph of Cécile Thévenet as Musette in La boheme (1900), at Getty Images.
 A photograph of Thévenet as Caroline in Die fledermaus (1904), at Getty Images.
 A photograph of Thévenet as Catherine in Le chemineau (1907), at Getty Images.

1872 births
Belgian opera singers
Musicians from Bruges
Year of death missing